KTC is an initialism for the following:

 Kadamba Transport Corporation
 Karnataka Theological College
 Kentucky Transportation Cabinet
 Korea Tungsten Company (TaeguTec), Korea
 Kill Time Communication, Japanese publishing company
 Kemnal Technology College, Secondary school and college in southeast London, UK.
Kill the Child, Live album made by experimental rock band Swans. 
KTC KYTACO, Motorcycle parts producer.